The Very Best of Winger  is a compilation album of material from the American rock band Winger, released by the label Atlantic Records and the company Rhino Entertainment in October 2001.

Most of the songs on the album were collected from the first three Winger studio albums: Winger (1988), In the Heart of the Young (1990) and Pull (1993). However, one new recording called "On the Inside" was featured, and a Japanese bonus track from the Pull album called "Hell to Pay" also was included. According to Kip Winger, "On the Inside" was a leftover riff from the Pull sessions that he and Reb Beach worked into a complete song for the release of this compilation.

Paradoxically, the album has a track listing essentially in reverse chronological order, with the more recently finished the song the earlier it appears.

Reviews
Music critic Stephen Thomas Erlewine lauded the release for the publication Allmusic, stating that it proved that the group has had "some good hooks, a good guitarist in Reb Beach, nice chemistry within the band, and a knack for a power ballad". He additionally praised the album's detailed liner notes. The critic noted that among heavy-sounding "bands of the late '80s/early '90s... they were the brunt of more jokes than any of their peers", most notably on the subversive program Beavis and Butt-Head. However, in Erlewine's view, that didn't change Winger's ability to generate multiple "classics", which the album collects.

Track listing
 "On the Inside" (Kip Winger, Reb Beach) – 4:24
 "Blind Revolution Mad" (Winger, Beach) – 5:26
 "Down Incognito" (Winger, Beach) – 3:48
 "Spell I'm Under" (Winger) – 3:56
 "Who's the One" (Winger, Beach) – 5:46
 "Junkyard Dog (Tears on Stone)" (Winger, Beach) – 6:55
 "Hell to Pay" (Winger, Beach) – 3:24
 "Can't Get Enuff" (Winger, Beach) – 4:24
 "Under One Condition" (Winger, Beach) – 4:30
 "Easy Come Easy Go" (Winger) – 4:06
 "Rainbow in the Rose" (Winger, Beach) – 5:34
 "Miles Away" (Paul Taylor) – 4:15
 "Seventeen" (Winger, Beach, Beau Hill) – 4:12
 "Madalaine" (Winger, Beach) – 3:47
 "Hungry" (Winger, Beach) – 4:01
 "Headed for a Heartbreak" (Winger) – 5:15

Personnel
 Kip Winger – vocals, bass guitar, keyboards
 Reb Beach – guitars, vocals
 Rod Morgenstein – drums and percussion
 Paul Taylor – guitar, keyboards, vocals
 John Roth – guitars, vocals

See also
 Glam metal
 Winger discography

References

2001 greatest hits albums
Winger (band) albums
Albums produced by Beau Hill
Albums produced by Kip Winger
Albums produced by Mike Shipley
Atlantic Records compilation albums
Rhino Entertainment compilation albums